Dataquest is an Indian magazine focused on information technology related articles. The magazine is published monthly by Cyber Media India Ltd, South Asia's largest specialty media group. It was one of the first publications to champion energy/green issues and the application of IT in governance.

History and profile
Dataquest Magazine started as an industry publication in 1982 to address the information needs of the then nascent IT industry in India. In the 1990s, it strengthened that position while broadening its coverage to include technology policies, markets and resellers.
Between 2008 and 2011, the magazine transformed itself to a complete publication on IT targeting the enterprise IT users such as CIOs and IT managers. That is also the period when the magazine saw significant research-based content.

The magazine runs two special sections on these two areas: Green IT and eGovernance.

References

External links
 Dataquest Website

1982 establishments in Delhi
English-language magazines published in India
Biweekly magazines published in India
Science and technology magazines published in India
Magazines established in 1982
Magazines published in Delhi